Gary Balletto (born May 21, 1975) is a world champion boxer. He has won 3 lightweight titles since 1996 IBU, EBA and USBF belts). Outside the ring, in his hometown of Providence, Rhode Island, Balletto is the New England representative for the Joint Association of Boxers (JAB), owns a boxing gym- Balletto’s Boxing Gym, a realty company- Balletto Realty, and a construction company- Balletto Construction. He has 3 children, Gary, Hailey, and Aiden.

Balletto turned pro just 10 days before his 21st birthday, amassing a 30–3–2 record in a 10-year career of boxing, 26 by way of knock out. One of his three losses came to Michael Clark (a unanimous decision in 10 rounds at Foxwoods), who would later appear on the ESPN reality show "Contender Season 2" as a team-mate of Balletto, where they both were on the Gold Team. Another loss came to Gregorio Vargas, a former WBC Featherweight champion and IBA Super-Featherweight champion, to whom Balletto lost his IBU title.

On the show, Balletto won his first-round fight, where Aaron Torres chose him as an opponent, by split decision. In his second fight, Norberto Bravo beat him, by unanimous decision.

In 2008, he appeared at IFC Theater in New York City to promote a feature verity documentary "Sweet Dreams", which told the story of his life and efforts to unionize the sport through JAB.

Balletto continued his boxing career, winning by technical knockout on against light welterweight prospect Matthew Strode.

In June 2013, Balletto sustained a spinal cord injury in his backyard playing with his son, spinning around on a pull up bar that gave way. He broke 6 vertebrae in his neck, leaving him with a C5 spinal cord injury.  He is now a paraplegic, paralyzed from the waist down.  Determined to fight this battle as he has all of his bouts in the ring, he has not let the injury slow him down. In 2017, Balletto founded “The Gary Tiger Balletto Foundation” to bring awareness to and provide resources and assistance to those with paralysis injuries.

His current efforts include the creation of the first affordable adaptive gym in the state of Rhode Island, in conjunction with the Cranston YMCA. He has already raised funds and donated two Functional Electric Stimulation bikes which are booked and used around the clock, by Balletto himself and others with paralysis injuries to maintain muscle health and prevent atrophy.

There is additional equipment being added to complete a full, comprehensive adaptive gym. The gym was set to open to members of the local community with like injuries and other conditions such as stroke, MS, etc. to come and work out alongside their family members by spring 2019.

Balletto resides in Cranston, Rhode Island, with his girlfriend and children.

Professional boxing record

References

External links
Gary "Tiger" Balletto's Official Website
 
Sweet Dreams Movie

1975 births
Living people
American people of Italian descent
Boxers from Rhode Island
The Contender (TV series) participants
American male boxers
Lightweight boxers